was a Japanese photographer from Nagoya. He was a driver of modernist and constructivist photography in Japan.

References
Nihon shashinka jiten / 328 Outstanding Japanese Photographers. Kyoto: Tankōsha, 2000. . 

Japanese photographers
1899 births
1982 deaths